The Helcomyzidae are a small family of flies in the Acalyptratae. The larvae feed on kelp and other organic matter washed up on shorelines. Species diversity is highest in New Zealand and south temperate South America. They are sometimes allied with the families Dryomyzidae or Coelopidae.

Classification
Genus: Helcomyza Curtis, 1825
Helcomyza mediterranea Loew, 1854
Helcomyza mirabilis Melander, 1920
Helcomyza ustulata Curtis, 1825
Genus: Maorimyia Tonnoir & Malloch, 1928
Maorimyia bipunctata (Hutton, 1901)
Genus: Paractora Bigot, 1888
Paractora angustata Malloch, 1933
Paractora antarctica (Thomson, 1869)
Paractora asymmetrica (Enderlein, 1930)
Paractora bipunctata (Hutton, 1901)
Paractora dreuxi Seguy, 1965
Paractora jeanneli Seguy, 1940
Paractora moseleyi (Austen, 1913)
Paractora rufipes (Macquart, 1844)
Paractora trichosterna (Thomson, 1869)

References

McAlpine, J. P. (ed.), 1981–89.Manual of Nearctic Diptera. Research Branch, Agriculture Canada Monograph

 
Brachycera families